Paul Ernest is a contributor to the social constructivist philosophy of mathematics.

Life

Paul Ernest is currently emeritus professor of the philosophy of mathematics education at Exeter University, UK. He is best known for his work on philosophical aspects of mathematics education and his contributions to developing a social constructivist philosophy of mathematics. He is currently working on the ethics of mathematics.

References

Ernest, Paul; Social Constructivism as a Philosophy of Mathematics; Albany, New York: State University of New York Press, (1998) 
Ernest, Paul; The Philosophy of Mathematics Education; London: RoutledgeFalmer, (1991)

External links
 Paul Ernest's page at Philosophy of Mathematics Education Journal, the journal that he edits at School of Education, University of Exeter-publications, CV etc.
 
 Paul Ernest's page at Amazon.com

Living people
Scientists from New York City
English mathematicians
20th-century American mathematicians
21st-century American mathematicians
Philosophers of mathematics
Mathematicians from New York (state)
Year of birth missing (living people)